The Virgelle Sandstone is a geologic formation overlain by the Two Medicine Formation. It formed from the beach sands exposed on northern and western shores of the receding Colorado Sea.

Footnotes

References
 Trexler, D., 2001, Two Medicine Formation, Montana: geology and fauna: In:  Mesozoic Vertebrate Life, edited by Tanke, D. H., and Carpenter, K., Indiana  University Press, pp. 298–309.

Sandstone formations of the United States
Cretaceous Montana